Samuel Ebart (1655-1684) was a German baroque composer.

He was Kantor and organist of Halle's Market Church, and on his death was succeeded by Friedrich Wilhelm Zachow. His best known surviving work is a solo motet Miserere Christe mei, which was among tenor Hugues Cuénod's concert pieces in the 1930s; it has also been recorded by soprano Ruth Ziesak.

References

1655 births
1684 deaths
17th-century classical composers
German Baroque composers
German classical composers
German male classical composers
17th-century male musicians